Ercüment Şahin (born 1 October 1968) is professional football manager and former player who manages FC Zürich U17s. Born in Switzerland, he made one appearance for the Turkey national team.

Club career
A striker, Ercüment began his career at his local club FC Zürich, where he became one of their top scorers. He had a brief stint at Chiasso. In 1995 he continued his career at Bursaspor, becoming a cult hero at the club. He thereafter played for Vanspor, Konyaspor and Sarıyer before retiring and moving on to management.

International career
Born in Switzerland to Turkish parents, Ercüment made one appearance with the Turkey national team in a 2–0 friendly win over Moldova on 14 August 1996.

References

External links
 
  (as player)
  (as coach)
 
 
 DBFCZ Profile
 SFL Management Profile

Living people
1968 births
People from Bülach
Turkish footballers
Turkish football managers
Turkey international footballers
Swiss men's footballers
Swiss football managers
Swiss people of Turkish descent
Swiss Super League players
Süper Lig players
FC Zürich players
Bursaspor footballers
Altay S.K. footballers
Konyaspor footballers
Sarıyer S.K. footballers
Association football forwards
Sportspeople from the canton of Zürich